General elections were held in Northern Rhodesia on 14 August 1948.

Electoral system
The ten elected members of the Legislative Council (an increase from eight in the 1944 elections) were elected from ten single-member constituencies. Two new constituencies were created; Lusaka was split out of the Midland constituency, whilst Mufulira–Chingola was created by taking Mufulira from the Luanshya constituency and Chingola from the Nkana constituency.

The Livingstone and Western and Southern constituencies were reorganised into Livingstone and South-Western. There were a total of 7,086 registered voters.

Results

See also
List of members of the Legislative Council of Northern Rhodesia (1948–53)

References

1948 in Northern Rhodesia
1948 elections in Africa
1948
1948